Washington Square, or Washington Square Park, is a public park in Salt Lake City, Utah, United States. The park surrounds the Salt Lake City and County Building.

Description

Washington Square includes the entire city block that is bounded by East 400 South (University Boulevard/Utah State Route 186), South 200 East, East, East 500 South (Cesar E. Chavez Boulevard), and South State Street (U.S. Route 89). 

The Salt Lake City and County Building, alone in the center of the block, takes up relatively little space. Trees, walkways, and statues surround the building making Washington Square like a small park. Indeed, the block is often the site of fairs, concerts and other activities.

Many of Salt Lake City's cultural events take place at Washington Square, and often South 200 East Street between it and Library Square is blocked off to create one large event plaza. Events that take place in this space include Utah Pride Festival, the Utah Arts Festival, and Salt Lake City Jazz Festival and the Living Traditions Festival that celebrates all the different cultures that reside within the state. These occur once per year and usually run over the weekends.

History

One notable gathering happened on June 16, 1995 when 50,000 people congregated on the west side of the City-County Building to watch the International Olympic Committee pick the host city for the 2002 Winter Olympics live on large projection screens. When IOC chairman Juan Antonio Samaranch read the winning city—Salt Lake City—the crowd at Washington Square cheered loudly for minutes, drowning out the rest of Samaranch's words. the square was also the site of several concerts during the games. The last leg of the Olympic torch relay started at Washington Square.

References

External links

Parks in Salt Lake City